Rory McLeod may refer to:

Rory McLeod (singer-songwriter) (born 1957), English songwriter and performer
Rory McLeod (snooker player) (born 1971), English snooker player

There is also a Scottish footballer, Rory MacLeod (born 2006)